is an arcade game developed and released by Namco and Sega in 2000. Two years later it was also published as a PlayStation 2 exclusive title with GunCon 2 compatibility.

Gameplay 

Ninja Assault was developed by Namco, who also created the Time Crisis series. However, this game has more in common with Lethal Enforcers, Virtua Cop, and The House of the Dead series, whereby the movement is completely "on-rails" (i.e., with no hiding pedal), and the player must shoot away from the screen to reload. Both versions of this game support up to two players in cooperative gameplay.

Plot
The story, according to the opening movie, is as follows:

"Once upon a time in feudal Japan, a brutal war raged. No one foresaw its conclusion, at least not in the manner in which it unfolded. And now...the evil Shogun Kigai has kidnapped Princess Koto in order to sacrifice her for his resurrection ritual. But there is hope.... Two courageous ninjas (Guren and Gunjo) have stepped forward. The battle among humans has ceased. And in its place, a new battle has begun: humans against demons."

Release 

Ninja Assault is advertised in in-game email message in Namco's Xenosaga Episode I: Der Wille zur Macht. After finishing the PS2 release of the game, one would unlock a code that could be entered in the contest at Namco's website.

Reception 

In Japan, Game Machine listed Ninja Assault on their December 15, 2000 issue as being the fourth most-successful dedicated arcade game of the month.

The PS2 version received "mixed" reviews according to the review aggregation website Metacritic. In its preview, IGN compared it with The House of the Dead 2. The same website later gave the Japanese version a mixed review over two months before it was released Stateside, along with Electronic Gaming Monthly, GamePro, Official U.S. PlayStation Magazine, and PSM. In Japan, Famitsu gave it a score of 28 out of 40.

References

External links 
 

2000 video games
Arcade video games
Cooperative video games
Light gun games
Multiplayer and single-player video games
Namco games
Now Production games
Video games about ninja
PlayStation 2 games
Rail shooters
Video games developed in Japan
Video games featuring female protagonists
Video games set in feudal Japan